The Fox–North coalition was a government in Great Britain that held office during 1783. As the name suggests, the ministry was a coalition of the groups supporting Charles James Fox and Lord North. The official head was William Cavendish-Bentinck, 3rd Duke of Portland, who took office on 2 April 1783.

Fox was a Whig by background, and North came from the nominal Tory Party; however, both had fallen out with the government of Lord Shelburne. They combined their forces in the House of Commons to throw out Shelburne's ministry and then form a government of their own.

King George III despised the government, and Fox in particular, but found that no other ministry could be formed at this stage despite several offers to William Pitt the Younger. Consequently, the King declined to provide the government with the normal tools of patronage, and it was forced to look elsewhere.

The Treaty of Paris was signed during this government on 3 September 1783, formally ending the American Revolutionary War. The government also came under strain when, from the opposition, Pitt introduced a proposal for electoral reform to tackle bribery and rotten boroughs. The proposal did not pass, but caused tensions within the coalition which contained both proponents and opponents of political reform.

The British East India Company was in trouble; Fox proposed nationalising it, thus providing the government with a new source of appointments so that it could reward and maintain support. The East India Bill was introduced and passed in the Commons, but the King remained deeply opposed. He informed the House of Lords that he would regard any peer who voted for the bill as his enemy. The bill was defeated on 17 December 1783 and the King immediately dismissed the coalition. It was succeeded by a government formed by William Pitt the Younger.

After being dismissed, Fox and North tried to force Pitt from power through defeat in the House of Commons, but he refused to resign. The response of opinion in the country, evidenced by petitions, resolutions of borough corporations and the actions of the London mobs, showed strong opposition to the coalition and support for Pitt. In March 1784 a general election was called in which Pitt's government made massive gains, especially in constituencies decided by popular votes.

Principal members of the government

See also
 Cameron–Clegg coalition

References

Bibliography

 

British ministries
Government
1783 establishments in Great Britain
1783 disestablishments in Great Britain
Ministries of George III of the United Kingdom
1780s in Great Britain